The Fantastic Dinosaur Adventure is the sequel to The Fantastic Flying Journey, both written by Gerald Durrell, illustrated by Graham Percy and published by Conran Octopus, this one in 1989. In this story, the Dollybutt children and their great-uncle Lancelot travel to the age of dinosaurs.

1989 British novels
British children's novels
Sequel novels
Books by Gerald Durrell
Children's novels about dinosaurs
Novels about time travel
1989 children's books
1989 science fiction novels